Muradymovo (Moraźım) is a rural locality (a village) in Baynazarovsky Selsoviet, Burzyansky District, Bashkortostan, Russia. The population was 374 as of 2010. There are 3 streets.

Geography 
Muradymovo is located 35 km north of Starosubkhangulovo (the district's administrative centre) by road. Baynazarovo is the nearest rural locality.

References 

Rural localities in Burzyansky District